Steve Betts, also known as Stephen F.X. Betts and  L. Howard Hughes, is a British songwriter and session musician. He formed new wave band The Books, which released three singles and an album, Expertise on Logo Records in 1980·. Subsequently, he was the keyboardist for the band the Associates. He also co-wrote and co-produced Peter Murphy's first solo album Should the World Fail to Fall Apart, and in the mid-1980s he formed Howard Hughes and the Western Approaches, releasing four singles on the Abstract and EG record labels.
 
His works have been selected for the 60x60 project in 2004, 2005, and 2006.

References

External links
https://www.discogs.com/release/1322428-The-Books-Expertise
https://www.discogs.com/search?q=Howard+Hughes%20and%20the%20Western%20Approaches&type=all
SoundCloud

The Associates (band) members
Living people
British rock keyboardists
British new wave musicians
British session musicians
Year of birth missing (living people)